Ocosta is an unincorporated community in Grays Harbor County, in the U.S. state of Washington.

History
The town, originally called Ocosta-by-the-sea, was the product of a disagreement between Aberdeen, WA and the Northern Pacific Railroad. In those days, it was common for the NP to accept a cash incentive from a town that wished to connect to the system. Aberdeen refused to pay, and the NP established the town in an attempt to bypass the city. The town was reached in 1892; however, Ocosta's harbor was found to be unsuitable, and the NP instead struck a deal with Aberdeen to build a spur into the city. When the 1893 financial panic occurred, the Northern Pacific ultimately halted progress, and the city of Aberdeen finished the spur, using rails from a sunken barque. A post office called Ocosta was established in 1890, and remained in operation until 1943. The community was named for the nearby ocean coast.

References

Unincorporated communities in Grays Harbor County, Washington
Unincorporated communities in Washington (state)